Więcek is a Polish surname. Notable people include:

 Feliks Więcek (1904-1978), Polish cyclist
 Maksymilian Więcek (1920-2006), Polish ice hockey player
 Margaret Wiecek, Polish-American operations researcher
 Miroslav Wiecek (1931-1997), Czech footballer
 Piotr Więcek (born 1990), Polish racing driver

Polish-language surnames